Ponca Creek is a stream that flows from southern South Dakota and into northern Nebraska. Ponca Creek starts out going east, then takes a southeast direction. It flows like that until around Bristow, Nebraska where it turns east again until it flows into the Missouri River. The entire Ponca Creek watershed drains . The watershed stretches from central Tripp County to central Gregory County.

Ponca Creek takes its name from the Ponca people, who are indigenous to the region and in whose nation the creek flowed.

Towns along the creek
The towns in the Ponca Creek watershed in South Dakota are Colome, Dallas, Gregory, Burke, Herrick, and St. Charles.
The towns along Ponca Creek in Nebraska are Anoka, Spencer, Bristow, Lynch, Monowi, and Verdel.

Named tributaries
The named tributaries of Ponca Creek are Masdon Creek, Murphy Creek, Blue Eyes Creek, Hay Creek, Willow Creek, Squaw Creek, Dizzy Creek, Dry Creek, Tobacco Creek, Spring Creek, Crooked Creek, Beaver Creek, Whiskey Creek, and Dewey Creek.

Ponca Creek does not flow into any lakes.

See also
List of rivers of Nebraska
List of rivers of South Dakota
Niobrara River
Keya Paha River

References

Sources 
 U.S. Geological Survey. National Hydrography Dataset high-resolution flowline data. The National Map. Retrieved 7/11/13.
 Ponca Creek- South Dakota Department of Environment and Natural Resources. Retrieved 7/11/13.
 

Rivers of Boyd County, Nebraska
Rivers of Gregory County, South Dakota
Rivers of Knox County, Nebraska
Rivers of Tripp County, South Dakota
Rivers of Nebraska
Rivers of South Dakota
Tributaries of the Missouri River